West Kikori Rural LLG is a local-level government (LLG) of Gulf Province, Papua New Guinea. Kiwaian languages are spoken in the LLG.

Wards
01. Haivaro
02. Moka (Minanibai language speakers)
03. Komaio
04. Masusu
05. Gibu
06. Ekeirau
07. Kibeni (Minanibai language speakers)
08. Omati-Gihiteri
09. Kaiam
10. Baina
11. Kemei
12. Dopima
13. Babaguina
14. Apeawa
15. Doibo
17. Kopi
82. Kikori Urban

References

Local-level governments of Gulf Province